Giorgi Chakvetadze (born 29 August 1999) is a Georgian professional footballer who plays as an attacking midfielder for Slovak club Slovan Bratislava, on loan from Gent, and the Georgia national team.

Club career

Early career and Dinamo Tbilisi
Born in Tbilisi, Chakvetadze started his career with Norchi Dinamo. His first manager was former footballer Tamaz Kostava, who described Chakvetadze as a hardworking player.

In 2010, after some successful seasons in the youth championships of Georgia, Chakvetadze moved to Dinamo Tbilisi, where he won U15 and U17 championships. In 2015, Chakvetadze signed a three-year deal with Dinamo.

Chakvetadze was promoted to the first team in 2016, making his debut against Locomotive Tbilisi on 18 November 2016, replacing Otar Kiteishvili. That season the young midfielder made 5 appearances for Dinamo. In the following season, Chakvetadze became a key figure of the club, scoring 5 goals in 24 appearances with the club, with two of them against Dila Gori.

Gent
At the end of summer 2017, Chakvetadze signed with Gent. The president of the Georgian club, Roman Pipia confirmed that the Belgian club was not the only one interested in signing the young player, declaring that Liverpool, Tottenham Hotspur, Hoffenheim and Bayer Leverkusen tried to sign him as well.

Following the 2017 season, Georgian Football Federation named Giorgi Chakvetadze the best young player of the year after his prolific performance both at the club and U19 Euro Championship.

In April 2018, he topped the list of seven young distinguished players based on votes from Belgian football fans.

Early next year Chakvetadze was included by UEFA in the list of 50 perspective players of 2019 among U21 players. 

Also, he was named in the symbolic team of Belgium's top division following the first half of the 2018-19 season.

Around the same time, Giorgi Chakvetadze received the Best Player of the Year award in Georgia, especially given his several impressive games in the 2018-19 UEFA Nations League campaign.

In December 2018, Chakvetadze suffered a knee injury, which later required a surgery. It saw him out of action for a long time.

His surname is transliterated as Tsjakvetadze in Dutch.

Loan to Hamburger SV
On 27 January 2022, Chakvetadze joined Hamburger SV on loan.

Loan to Slovan Bratislava
On 4 July 2022, Slovan Bratislava signed Giorgi Chakvetadze on one-year loan. He debuted with his new club as a second-half substitute on 6 July during the UEFA Champions League 1st qualifying round game against Dinamo Batumi.

International career
Chakvetadze scored his debut goal of his senior career in a friendly match against Lithuania on 24 March 2018 in Tbilisi, where Georgia achieved a 4–0 win over its guests.

On 6 September 2018, Chakvetadze opened the scoring in a 2–0 win over Kazakhstan, the first goal in the history of the UEFA Nations League. On 19 November 2018, he assisted and scored again for Georgia in his country's 2–1 win over Kazakhstan which confirmed the country as the winner of its group.

Career statistics

Club

International

Scores and results list Georgia's goal tally first, score column indicates score after each Chakvetadze goal.

References

1999 births
Living people
Footballers from Tbilisi
Footballers from Georgia (country)
Association football midfielders
Georgia (country) international footballers
Georgia (country) under-21 international footballers
Georgia (country) youth international footballers
Erovnuli Liga players
Belgian Pro League players
2. Bundesliga players
Slovak Super Liga players
FC Dinamo Tbilisi players
K.A.A. Gent players
Hamburger SV players
ŠK Slovan Bratislava players
Expatriate footballers from Georgia (country)
Expatriate sportspeople from Georgia (country) in Belgium
Expatriate footballers in Belgium
Expatriate sportspeople from Georgia (country) in Germany
Expatriate footballers in Germany
Expatriate sportspeople from Georgia (country) in Slovakia
Expatriate footballers in Slovakia